Route 341 is a state highway in western Connecticut, running from the New York state line in Kent to Washington.

Route description

Route 341 begins at an intersection with Bog Hollow Road at the New York state line in Kent and heads southeast along Bog Hollow Brook and Macedonia Brook.  It crosses the Housatonic River and continues southeast, then turns east and northeast across the town into Warren.  In Warren, it continues generally east to the center of town, then turns south for a long overlap with Route 45.  After leaving Route 45, it turns southeast to the southeast corner of Warren and crosses into Washington.  In Washington, it turns south to end at an intersection with US 202 by the Shepaug River in the Woodville section of town.

History
Prior to 1932, the section west of US 7 was known as State Highway 127 and the section east of Route 45 was known as State Highway 299. Modern Route 341 was established as part of the 1932 state highway renumbering. Route 341 in Connecticut has had no significant changes since its designation.

Major intersections

References

External links

341
Transportation in Litchfield County, Connecticut